Pouwhenua or pou whenua (land post), are carved wooden posts used by Māori, the indigenous peoples of New Zealand to mark territorial boundaries or places of significance. They are generally artistically and elaborately carved and can be found throughout New Zealand.

The Pouwhenua is also a long-handled fighting staff with a club-like broad head for striking.

Cultural significance 
Much like totem poles, pou whenua tell a story. They are significant to the Māori people, representing their contributions to the cultural heritage of New Zealand. They acknowledge the association between the people (tāngata) and the land (whenua). Specifically, they reflect the relationship between the ancestors, environment, and the reputation or standing of the tangata whenua.

Weaponry 
Belonging to the same class of weaponry as the tewhatewha and taiaha, pouwhenua are usually made of wood and have a large, broad blade known as rau at one end and a pointed, sharp tip at the other end. Usually a human head motif was carved on the shaft to form a boundary between the shaft and the long spear point.  Pouwhenua were used for attacking an opponent with short sharp strikes or stabbing thrusts with quick footwork on the part of the wielder. A single blow with the broad blade could easily result in death.

See also
Pou whakarae

Other Māori weapons:
Mere (weapon)
Kotiate  
Tewhatewha
Patu
Taiaha
Wahaika

References

External links 

 Pouwhenua (pointed fighting staff) from the collection of the Museum of New Zealand Te Papa Tongarewa
 http://news.tangatawhenua.com/archives/10712

Māori art
Māori culture